Bryan Peter Reardon (December 30, 1928 – November 16, 2009) was the Chairman of the Department of Classics at the University of California at Irvine, and a noted scholar of the ancient Greek novel.

Early life and education 
Born in Manchester, England on December 30, 1928, Bryan Peter Reardon received his Master of Arts from Glasgow University in Scotland in 1951. He earned his Bachelor's from St. John's College of Cambridge University in England in 1953.  He then received his PhD from the Université de Nantes in France, in 1968.

Career 
Reardon began his career as an associate professor at Memorial University Newfoundland, Canada, from 1958 until 1967. He was a professor at Trent University in Ontario, Canada, from 1967 until 1974. He became professor of classics at the University College of North Wales from 1974 until 1978, and served as Head of Department there. In 1978 Reardon moved to the United States in 1978 to become the chairman of the Department of Classics at the University of California, Irvine. He served in this position until 1983.

Death 
Reardon died at home in Lion-sur-Mer, Normandy, France on November 16, 2009.

References 

1928 births
2009 deaths
Alumni of the University of Glasgow
Academics from Greater Manchester
University of California, Irvine faculty
Alumni of St John's College, Cambridge
University of Nantes alumni
Academic staff of the Memorial University of Newfoundland
Academic staff of Trent University
Academics of Bangor University